Isabel Island may refer to:

Isabel Island (Chile)
Isabel Island (Philippines)

See also
Isabela Island (disambiguation)
Isla Isabel National Park, Mexico
Santa Isabel Island, Solomon Islands